Law of Courage (literally "the kid judge") is a 1994 Italian drama film directed by Alessandro Di Robilant. It was entered into the 44th Berlin International Film Festival where it won the Blue Angel Award. For this film Giulio Scarpati was awarded with a David di Donatello for Best Actor.

Cast
 Giulio Scarpati as Rosario Livatino
 Sabrina Ferilli as Angela Guarnera
 Leopoldo Trieste as Mr. Livatino
 Regina Bianchi as Mrs. Livatino (as Régina Bianchi)
 Paolo De Vita as Maresciallo
 Francesco Bellomi as Vincenzo Calò
 Virginia Bellomo as Moglie di Saetta
 Giovanni Boncoddo as Giudice Cali'
 Gabriella Bove as Moglie del Maresciallo
 Antonino Bruschetta as Di Salvo
 Renato Carpentieri as Migliore

References

External links

1994 films
1990s biographical drama films
1990s Italian-language films
Films directed by Alessandro Di Robilant
Italian biographical drama films
Films with screenplays by Ugo Pirro
1994 drama films
1990s Italian films